St. John Cantius School is a high school in Poznań, Poland named after the scholar and theologian St. John Cantius.

It was founded in 1920 by Gotthilf Berger, Edward Raczyński and Hipolit Cegielski, in place of the German-language high school previously known as Friedrich Wilhelm Gymnasium, in honor of Frederick III. Between 1853 and the First World War the Polish-German sections of the school were known also as the Real School and the Berger Gymnasium after G. Berger.

Some notable alumni include: Florian Marciniak, Władysław Niegolewski, Zbigniew Zakrzewski, Xaver Scharwenka and Zygmunt Gorgolewski. Noted faculty members included Hermann Loew and Karol Libelt.

Sources
Official site of Poznań city
Official site of Wielkopolska

Schools in Poznań
Educational institutions established in 1920
1920 establishments in Poland